Carl Levy may refer to:

 Carl Edvard Marius Levy (1808–1865), professor and head of the Danish Maternity institution in Copenhagen 
 Carl Levy (banker), a German banker
 Carl Levy (political scientist), professor of politics